The Men's aerials competition at the FIS Freestyle Ski and Snowboarding World Championships 2021 was held on 10 March 2021.

Qualification
The qualification was started at 12:25. The 12 best skiers qualified for the final.

Final
The final was started at 15:20.

References

Men's aerials